The archery events at the 2016 Summer Olympics in Rio de Janeiro were held over a seven-day period from 6 to 12 August. Four events took place, all were staged at the Sambadrome Marquês de Sapucaí.

Competition format 
A total of 128 athletes compete across the four events: the men's individual, women's individual, men's team and women's team.

All four events were recurve archery events, held under the World Archery-approved 70-meter distance and rules. The competition started with an initial ranking round involving all 64 archers of each gender. Each archer would shoot a total of 72 arrows to be seeded from 1–64 according to their score.

The ranking round was also used to seed the teams from 1 to 12, by aggregating the individual scores for the members of each team.

Each event was played in a single-elimination tournament format, except for the semi-final losers, who would play off to decide the bronze medal winner.

Individual events 
In the individual events, all 64 competitors entered the competition at the first round, the round of 64. The draw was seeded according to the result of the ranking round so the first seed shot against the 64th seed in the first round.

Each match was scored using the Archery Olympic Round, consisting of the best-of-five sets, with three arrows per set. The winner of each set received two points, and if the scores in the set had tied then each archer would have received one point. If at the end of five sets the score had been tied at 5–5, a single arrow shoot-off would have held and the closest to the center would be declared the winner.

Team events 
In the team events, the top four seeded teams from the ranking round will receive a bye to the quarter-final. The remaining eight teams, seeded 5th to 12th, will compete for the remaining four places in the quarter-finals.

For the first time, the team event has followed the same Archery Olympic Round set system as the individual event.

Schedule 
All times are Brasília Time (UTC−3).

Participating nations
Archers from 56 nations participated at the 2016 Summer Olympics.

Competitors

Medal summary

Medal table

Medalists

See also
Archery at the 2016 Summer Paralympics

References

External links 

 
 
 
 
 Results Book – Archery

 
2016
2016 Summer Olympics events
2016 in archery
International archery competitions hosted by Brazil